The Lake Chelan-Sawtooth Wilderness is a  protected wilderness area located within the Okanogan and Wenatchee national forests in Washington State. The wilderness borders Lake Chelan National Recreation Area and North Cascades National Park and the Stephen Mather Wilderness to the northwest. It was designated with the passage of the Washington Wilderness Act of 1984, on lands occupied by the old Chelan Division of the Washington Forest Reserve, now part of both the Okanogan and Wenatchee national forests.

Habitat
There are 63 lakes, many too small to have ever been named, often located in the high country without trail access.  The wilderness encompasses a diverse mixture of dense forest, meadows, alpine slopes, geology, and high country. The open forest below tree line is home to bears and mule deer. Snow often covers much of the area from mid or late October through late June.

Trails
Approximately 194 miles of trails traverse the Lake Chelan-Sawtooth Wilderness. Trails tend to be steady climbs into high basins and glacial cirques with lakes. The south facing portion of the range has more open, rolling high country that falls off very steeply into the Lake Chelan valley. All trailheads on the south side, on Lake Chelan, must be gained via a regularly scheduled ferry boat or a private craft. Trails entering from the west first cross North Cascades National Park or Lake Chelan National Recreation Area.

See also
 List of U.S. Wilderness Areas
 Wilderness Act

References

External links
Lake Chelan-Sawtooth Wilderness U.S. Forest Service
Lake Chelan-Sawtooth Wilderness Wilderness.net (The University of Montana)

Protected areas of Chelan County, Washington
IUCN Category Ib
North Cascades of Washington (state)
Protected areas of Okanogan County, Washington
Wilderness areas of Washington (state)
Wenatchee National Forest
Okanogan National Forest
1984 establishments in Washington (state)
Protected areas established in 1984